Nicolás "Niko" Hernández (born May 4, 1979 in Buenos Aires, Argentina) is an Argentine retired footballer.

Career
Hernández began his professional career with the Primera División side Ferro Carril Oeste in 1999. After a year with them he moved to Colón de Santa Fe for a season.  In 2002, he was signed by Italian club U.S. Cremonese.  After a short spell with them he ended up back in Argentina playing for National B Division teams San Martín de Mendoza and Huracán until 2005 when he was picked up by Chilean powerhouse Cobreloa.

On March 30, 2006, he was signed by the Colorado Rapids. He started his first game with the club on April 2 against the Columbus Crew and scored 8 goals for the club. He was traded to the Columbus Crew on February 27, 2008 for Tim Ward. He was waived on June 27, 2008.

Niko moved to Costa Rica for play with the Liga Deportiva Alajuelense during one-year contract.
 He was the only non-Costa Rican on the roster.

He joined V-League side SHB Đà Nẵng F.C. in 2010.

In 2012, Niko moved to Vietnamese First Division side Quảng Nam.

References

External links
Statistics at Guardian Stats Centre
 Argentine Primera statistics

1979 births
Living people
Footballers from Buenos Aires
Association football forwards
Argentine footballers
Argentine expatriate footballers
Ferro Carril Oeste footballers
Club Atlético Colón footballers
Club Atlético Huracán footballers
U.S. Cremonese players
San Martín de Mendoza footballers
Cobreloa footballers
Colorado Rapids players
Columbus Crew players
L.D. Alajuelense footballers
SHB Da Nang FC players
Quang Nam FC players
Torneo Argentino B players
Argentine Primera División players
Primera Nacional players
Torneo Federal A players
Liga FPD players
Major League Soccer players
V.League 1 players
Expatriate footballers in Italy
Expatriate footballers in Chile
Expatriate soccer players in the United States
Expatriate footballers in Costa Rica
Expatriate footballers in Vietnam
Argentine expatriate sportspeople in Italy
Argentine expatriate sportspeople in Chile
Argentine expatriate sportspeople in the United States
Argentine expatriate sportspeople in Costa Rica
Argentine expatriate sportspeople in Vietnam